Ottawa Central Station was the main inter-city bus station in Ottawa, Ontario, Canada. It was located 1.5 km south of downtown Ottawa in the Centretown neighbourhood and served buses from Greyhound Canada, Ontario Northland and Autobus Gatineau.  It closed on June 1, 2021, and the land it sat on is now owned by Brigil, a real estate developer, who plans to build a multi-use space for housing, dining, retail, and other businesses.

Ottawa Central Station was located at 265 Catherine Street, between Lyon Street and Kent Street. Catherine Street lies directly north of Ontario Highway 417 (known locally as the Queensway), which is the main expressway through Ottawa. The former station was accessible from highway 417 exits 120 (eastbound) and 119 (westbound).

The station's main entrance faced south towards Catherine Street and the 417. On the north side of the station building, buses called at 14 outdoor bus stands with adjoining indoor gates. The front of the buses were partially covered by a roof overhang.

The property it sat on is located one block west of Bank Street, a major north-south commercial street in Ottawa. Continuing north on Bank Street leads to downtown and the main government and business district, while south of highway 417, the street passes through the more residential neighbourhood of the Glebe on its way to Landsdowne Park and the Rideau Canal.

Nearby landmarks include the Canadian Museum of Nature on Metcalfe Street and beyond that, the southern end of Elgin Street, a north-south commercial street with many small shops, restaurants and bars.

Main destinations
Historically, the majority of buses serving the station were operated by Voyageur Colonial Bus Lines (later Greyhound Canada.) Destinations from Ottawa included Toronto (with connections to the United States), Montreal (with connections to the United States and Quebec City), Syracuse (with connections to New York City and Philadelphia), and Sudbury. Greyhound Canada suspended all its routes in May 2020; on October 1, it announced it would not be using the station when it resumed activities. Ultimately, the company ceased operations entirely on May 13, 2021.

On January 21, 2016, Ontario Northland Motor Coach Services began operating between Ottawa Central Station and Sudbury to better serve passengers connecting to and from Northern Ontario communities. Destinations included Sudbury, North Bay, Pembroke, Petawawa, Sault Ste. Marie, and White River. Following the station's closure, this service now operates from Ottawa Train Station.

On February 29, 2016, Autobus Gatineau, a subsidiary of Autobus Maheux, began operating from Ottawa Central Station to Gatineau, Kazabazua, Maniwaki, and Grand-Remous after Greyhound reduced service to Fridays and Sundays only. Greyhound later discontinued offering this service altogether.  Autobus Gatineau's service continued to use a street stop at 265 Catherine Street until 2022.

Services

Station services included free Wi-Fi and a travel lounge with seating, tables, power outlets. The lounge was open at all times to travelers in the station.

The station also offered a number of vending machines with coffee and other hot beverages, muffins, sandwiches, soups and salads, ice cream, chips, chocolate bars and cold drinks, as well as earbuds. All vending machines accepted Interac Flash, Visa, MasterCard, Apple Pay and Google Pay.  In addition, the station offered a baggage storage service for passengers.

There was also an ATM and a Mr. Sub restaurant featuring Country Style hot beverages and baked goods. Protect Guard Services operated as the station's main security. Ideal Control Systems and First Student offices are located on the second level of the terminal.

The station's operating hours were daily from 5:00 am to 2:30 am. The parcel department's hours were  Monday to Friday 7:00 am to 8:00 pm, Saturday 8:00 am to 5:00 pm and Sunday/holidays 12:00 pm to 5:00 pm.

Local Bus Connections (OC Transpo)

For frequent service to downtown, walk one block east of the station to Bank Street and cross the street. Bank/Catherine Stop 8895 is next to a street light on the southeast corner of the intersection and by the raised berm of an office building parking lot. From there, you can catch the  Rockliffe or the  St. Laurent bus for downtown and the Rideau Centre.

For more local bus route information, see OC Transpo routes

History

Ottawa Central Station once had the same management as Montreal's major bus terminal, Gare d'autocars de Montréal before the latter was purchased by the Quebec government. On February 7, 2011, the terminal operations were sold to Corporate Customer Service Limited, a sub-contractor of Greyhound Canada. Corporate Customer Service formed a new company, Ottawa Central Station Inc., to manage the terminal. On September 1, 2011, Corporate Customer Service Ltd. handed over the head lease to Greyhound, who in turn negotiated and signed a long-term lease with the property's owner. Ottawa Central Station Inc. remains as an agency within a Greyhound terminal. The building and the lot is owned by Crerar Silverside Corporation.

Proposed relocation
In early 2010, Ottawa Mayor Larry O'Brien announced that he was working with Greyhound to move to bus terminal to a new location next to the Via Rail station on Tremblay Road, effectively creating a transport hub along with the proposed LRT. According to O'Brien, talks had been going on for a while and Greyhound seemed warm to the idea, however the Catherine station's owner, Stewart Robertson, was never consulted and only learned through the media about the proposed move. The move sparked controversy and mixed opinions with the public and local politicians, stating that the proposed location is inconvenient as it is not central, or more convenient as it is along the Transitway.

Robertson, the station's owner, released renderings of a proposed renovation that would see the inside and outside of the terminal's aesthetics improved as well as the terminal's heating and ventilation system, however these improvements would only come if Greyhound were to sign a long-term agreement with Robertson, which in the end would result in Station Centrale being phased out as the terminal's operators.

On March 11, 2011, it was revealed that Stewart Robertson had applied for rezoning of the lot to general mixed-use as a contingency plan if Greyhound were to leave.

In September 2011, Greyhound signed a long-term lease with Crerar Silverside Corporation. As a result, the terminal was not to be relocated and extensive renovations were to be done to the station in 2011 and 2012, possibly totalling over one million dollars.

Future

Brigil, a real estate developer, purchased the station from Crerar Silverside in 2021.  It plans to demolish the station and redevelop the site, with construction beginning in 2023.

See also

 Gare d'autocars de Montréal
 Greyhound Canada
 Voyageur Colonial Bus Lines
 Ottawa station - Ottawa's main train station
 Ottawa Macdonald–Cartier International Airport  - Ottawa's international airport

References

External links
 Greyhound Canada
 Ottawa Central Station
 Busbud Ottawa Central Station Bus Fare Search
 Investigation Services Ltd.
 Keep It Downtown, Ottawa
 YOW Airporter Shuttle

Bus stations in Ottawa
Transport infrastructure completed in 1972
Former bus stations
1972 establishments in Ontario
2021 disestablishments in Ontario